Perry L. McCarty is an American scientist and professor of environmental engineering.  He is best known for his contributions to the environmental engineering profession through education, research, and service to government and industry.

McCarty earned his B.S. in civil engineering from Wayne State University.  He completed his M.S. in sanitary engineering from Massachusetts Institute of Technology in 1957 and his Sc.D. from MIT in 1959.  Since 1962, he has been a member of the faculty of Stanford University, where he held the Silas H. Palmer Professorship of civil engineering.

McCarty is a Fellow of the American Academy of Arts and Sciences, the American Academy of Microbiology, the American Association for the Advancement of Science, and the Water Environment Federation.  He is a lifetime honorary member of the American Academy of Environmental Engineers and Scientists, the American Society of Civil Engineers, the American Water Works Association, the Association of Environmental Engineering and Science Professors, and the Water Environment Federation.

McCarty was elected a member of the National Academy of Engineering in 1977 for contributions to the environmental engineering profession through education, research, and service to government and industry.  In 1992, he received the Tyler Prize for Environmental Achievement, in 1997 he received the Athalie Richardson Irvine Clarke Prize for outstanding achievements in water science and technology, and in 2007, he received the Stockholm Water Prize citing, "his [McCarty's] pioneering work in developing the scientific approach for the design and operation of water and wastewater systems."
In August, 2016, Stanford named him an "engineering hero".

References 

Environmental engineers
Living people
Stanford University faculty
MIT School of Engineering alumni
Wayne State University alumni
Members of the United States National Academy of Engineering
Fellows of the American Academy of Arts and Sciences
1931 births